Household Name is the third studio album by American indie rock band Momma. It was released on July 1, 2022, by Polyvinyl and Lucky Number. The album was produced by Momma multi-instrumentalist Aron Kobayashi Ritch.

Singles and promotion 
"Medicine", the album's first single, was released on November 17, 2021. The album's second single, "Rockstar", was released on February 22, 2022.

The band announced the album alongside the release of the third single, "Speeding 72", on April 19, 2022. Two more singles, "Lucky" and "Motorbike", preceded the album's release.

Followed by a brief tour of the UK in May 2022, Momma toured the United States during the summer supporting Snail Mail directly followed by a headline tour in the fall with support from waveform*, Pardoner and teethe to promote their album. They toured the United States supporting Surf Curse in November and December 2022. In 2023, they toured the United States with Death Cab For Cutie and Europe and the UK with Alex G.

Influences and inspirations 
Momma was influenced by alternative rock and grunge artists and bands from the 1990's while making this album, such as Liz Phair, Pavement, Nirvana, The Smashing Pumpkins and Veruca Salt. The band described their album as "the rise and fall of a rock star and the tropes and tribulations that come with the arc." and were inspired by relationships, the music industry's flaws, the archetype of a rock star and changes in their lives, such as breakups, while writing the album.

Critical reception 

Household Name was met with generally positive reviews. At Metacritic, which assigns a normalized rating out of 100 to reviews from mainstream publications, the album received an average score of 76, based on ten reviews. Aggregator AnyDecentMusic? gave it 7.6 out of 10, based on their assessment of the critical consensus.

Household Name was praised by critics upon its release for its sound reminiscent of 90's rock. The album appeared on several year-end lists in 2022.

Track listing

Personnel 
Assistant engineer - Hayden Ticehurst
Bass - Kevin Grimmet on all tracks except "Speeding 72"
Cello - Dorothy Carlos 
Double bass - Sebastian Jones 
Drums, electric guitar and string arrangements by - Zach Capitti Fenton
Lacquer cut by Chris Muth
Mastered by Chris Allgood and Emily Lazar 
Photography - Daria Kobayashi Ritch
Producer, mixed by, engineer, electric guitar, acoustic guitar, baritone guitar, percussion, string arrangements, drum programming, keyboards, sampler and ambience - Aron Kobayashi Ritch
Vocals, backing vocals, electric guitar, acoustic guitar - Allegra Weingarten
Vocals, bass on "Speeding 72", backing vocals, electric guitar, baritone guitar, piano, artwork, design - Etta Friedman

References

External links

Rock albums by American artists
Alternative rock albums by American artists
2022 albums